Gotham Records was an American record label formed by Sam Goode (Goody) and Ivin Ballen in New York City in 1946. In January 1948 Ballen acquired the interest of Goode and became the sole owner. He then moved the company to Philadelphia, Pennsylvania where the label was based for the rest of its existence until 1956. The label specialized in rhythm and blues. Ivin Ballen died in Miami Beach, Florida, in February 1978.

Artists
Dan Pickett
Gotham's most notable contribution to American music was the release of recordings by the acoustic bluesman Dan Pickett, originally recorded in 1949. 
 Doug  Quattlebaum
Another artist who recorded for Gotham included Doug Quattlebaum. His song "Lizzie Lou" was one of the last releases for the label.
 Doris Browne, The Capris
Doris Browne was a singer who around the 1949/1950 period had she performed on a weekly show which was broadcast by WPEN-AM in Philadelphia. The hour long show was called the Parisian Tailor Kiddie Hour. In 1953, the label appeared to be keen to push Browne's profile  with her single "Please Believe Me" bw "Oh Baby". She was backed by Doc Bagby on that recording. He also backed her on her single, "Until The End Of Time" bw "Why Don't You Love Me Now, Now, Now?" Gotham G-296, and another recording "The Game Of Love" bw "My Cherie" which was released on Gotham G-7298 as a 45. The single, "Until The End Of Time" / "Why Don't You Love Me Now", originally credited to Doris Browne, Doc Bagby Orchestra, was re-released on Collectables Records, but this time credited to Doris Browne & The Capris. Gotham records also had a Capris group of their own which would release their debut single "God Only Knows" bw "That's What You're Doing To Me", Gotham 304 in 1954. They also had two other singles released. They were "It Was Moonglow" bw "Too Poor To Love", Gotham 306, and "It's A Miracle" bw "Let's Linger A While" Gotham 308.

Santa Monica-based label
A same-named label is available in Santa Monica. It was founded by Patrick Arn in New York City in 1994. The label specializes in newcomer rock bands. Some of the older bands who signed at this Gotham Records signed later at Columbia Records (for example: Flybanger) or to Lava Records (Liquid Gang). The Loose Nutz produced their first Gold Record Wishen at Gotham Records.

Background
In 2013, the label was releasing 8 LPs and 8 CDs a year. Its distribution was being handled by Sony RED.

Artists
Around 2007, it was announced in punknews.org that Red Horizon had signed to the label and recently released their album Across the World.

Bands and artists currently signed at Gotham Records
 Red Horizon
 Supafuzz
 The day after...

Bands who were signed at Gotham Records
 Flybanger
 Fear The Clown
 Liquid Gang
 Chiba-Ken

References

External links
 Gotham Records Official homepage

Record labels established in 1946
Rhythm and blues record labels
American record labels
1946 establishments in New York City